The Luoding Railway is a privately owned railway in Guangdong Province, People's Republic of China. It became the only privately owned passenger rail service in the People's Republic of China in 2006, when it was sold to Shenzhen China Technology Industry Group Corporation Limited.

See also 
 Rail transport in the People's Republic of China
 List of railways in China

Railway lines in China
Rail transport in Guangdong